Jadelin Mabiala Gangbo (born 1976) is a writer who was born in Brazzaville, Republic of the Congo. He lived between Imola and Bologna from the age of four. He recently moved to London, where he now lives.

Works 
Jadelin Mabiala Gangbo has published several short stories and novels in Italian as Verso la Notte Bakonga (Toward the Bakonga Night),  and Rometta and Giulieo. Verso la notte Bakonga is a portrait of Italian society and culture through a construction of a different identity and influences. In fact, Gangbo narrates a story of a young man from Bakongo, born in Brazzaville but raised in Italy.

His most recent book, Due volte, is a novel about the adventures of twins in a religious institute, awaiting their father's release from prison. Meanwhile, the brothers grow up and are torn between two cultures: the Congolese of their origin and the Italian in which they live. While one of the two, David, is drawn to the Catholic philosophy and the promise of eternal life, Daniel loves Agatha, a girl who was raped by her uncle. Around them, moves a world of characters who reflect the ills and hopes in Italy in the 1980s: Pasquale, a young racketeer, Giò Giò the complainer, single mothers, Gypsies, sisters and teachers. 
Gangbo is the winner of a literary award for migrant writers, Eks&Tra.

Publications 
Verso la Notte Bakonga, Toward the Bakonga Night, Portofranco, 1999
Rometta e Giulieo, Feltrinelli Editore, 2001
Una congrega di falliti, Instar, 2008
Due volte, E/O, 2009

References

External links 
Interview with Gangbo

Republic of the Congo writers
Living people
Republic of the Congo emigrants to England
Republic of the Congo emigrants to Italy
Italian emigrants to the United Kingdom
Writers from Bologna
People from Brazzaville
People from Imola
1976 births